The Northeastern Huskies men's ice hockey team is an NCAA Division I college ice hockey program that represents Northeastern University in Boston, Massachusetts. The team has competed in Hockey East since 1984 and has won three tournament titles, having previously played in the Eastern College Athletic Conference (ECAC), where they won one tournament championship. The Huskies currently play home games at the 4,666-seat Matthews Arena, the world's oldest hockey arena still in use. Jerry Keefe assumed the head coach role in 2021 after longtime coach Jim Madigan moved to athletic director.

History
The men's ice hockey program has existed since 1929 and played as an independent NCAA Division I team until joining the ECAC in 1961. Northeastern is a founding member of the Hockey East athletic conference, which the team joined in 1984.  The Huskies had their most success in the 1980s, when the team won the prestigious Beanpot tournament four times (1980, 1984, 1985, 1988) and was the runner-up twice (1983 and 1987).  The Huskies ended a 30-year Beanpot drought in 2018, followed by repeated wins in 2019 and 2020, for a total of seven championships.

Its best season came in 1982, when the Huskies finished 25–9–2 and made it to the NCAA Frozen Four.  They also won the Hockey East championship in 1988, 2016, and 2019, and made appearances in the NCAA hockey tournament in 1988, 1994, 2009, 2016, 2018, and 2019.

Northeastern players who have gone on to significant professional hockey careers have included David Poile '71, long time general manager of the NHL Washington Capitals and current general manager of the NHL Nashville Predators, St. Louis Blues goaltender and two-time All-American Bruce Racine '88, NHL defenseman Dan McGillis, Montreal Canadiens winger Chris Nilan, and Chicago Blackhawks defenseman and Hobey Baker Award finalist Jim Fahey '02.

Other than those who have achieved success in the professional ranks, some of the more notable individual players in team history include Adam Gaudette, the 2018 Hobey Baker Award winner as the most valuable player in NCAA collegiate hockey (the only such winner in the program's history); Art Chisholm and Ray Picard, each two-time All-Americans; and Sandy Beadle and Jason Guerriero, each a one-time All-American who was also a Hobey Baker Award finalist.  Chisholm is the leading career goal scorer for the Huskies with 100, while Jim Martel is the career scoring leader with 210 points.  The most notable goaltenders in team history are Racine, Keni Gibson and Cayden Primeau, who between them hold most school career records.  Devon Levi broke Brad Thiessen's single-season record of shutouts in 2022 with 10, his first full year starting in goal.

Season-by-season results

Source:

Head coaches
As of the mid-way point of 2022–23 season

Roster
As of August 11, 2022.

Statistical leaders
Source:

Career points leaders

Rico Rossi is the Huskies' career penalty minute leader with 406; Eric Williams is the career games leader with 155.

Career goaltending leaders

GP = Games played; Min = Minutes played; W = Wins; L = Losses; T = Ties; GA = Goals against; SO = Shutouts; SV% = Save percentage; GAA = Goals against average

minimum 30 games played

Statistics current through the mid-way part of the 2022–23 season.

Awards and honors

Hockey Hall of Fame
Source:

Fernie Flaman (1990)

United States Hockey Hall of Fame
Source:

David Poile (2018)
Sid Watson (1999)

NCAA

Individual awards

Hobey Baker Award
Adam Gaudette: 2018

Spencer Penrose Award
Fernie Flaman: 1982

Mike Richter Award
Cayden Primeau: 2019
Devon Levi: 2022

NCAA Scoring Champion
Zach Aston-Reese: 2017
Adam Gaudette: 2018

All-American teams
AHCA First Team All-Americans

1951–52: Ray Picard, G
1952–53: Ray Picard, G
1959–60: Art Chisholm, F
1960–61: Art Chisholm, F
1980–81: Sandy Beadle, F
1986–87: Bruce Racine, G
1987–88: Bruce Racine, G
1989–90: Rob Cowie, D
1995–96: Dan McGillis, F
1997–98: Marc Robitaille, G
2001–02: Jim Fahey, D
2004–05: Jason Guerriero, F
2008–09: Brad Thiessen, G
2016–17: Zach Aston-Reese, F
2017–18: Jérémy Davies, D; Adam Gaudette, F; Dylan Sikura, F
2018–19: Cayden Primeau, G
2021–22: Devon Levi, G; Aidan McDonough, F

AHCA Second Team All-Americans

1947–48: Jim Bell, F
1983–84: Ken Manchurek, F
1984–85: Jim Averill, F
1987–88: Brian Dowd, D
2014–15: Kevin Roy, F
2018–19: Jérémy Davies, F
2019–20: Tyler Madden, F
2021–22: Jordan Harris, D

ECAC Hockey

Individual awards

Most Outstanding Player in Tournament
Mark Davidner: 1982

All-Conference teams
First Team All-ECAC Hockey

1962–63: Leo Dupere, F
1963–64: Leo Dupere, F
1980–81: Sandy Beadle, F

Second Team All-ECAC Hockey

1963–64: Larry Bone, F
1964–65: Don Turcotte, D
1966–67: Don Turcotte, D
1967–68: Ken Leu, G
1969–70: David Poile, F

Hockey East

Individual awards

Player of the Year
Brad Thiessen: 2009
Zach Aston-Reese: 2017
Adam Gaudette: 2018
Devon Levi: 2023

Rookie of the Year
Devon Levi: 2022

Best Defensive Forward
Joe Vitale: 2009
Justin Hryckowian: 2023

Len Ceglarski Award
Mike Jozefowicz: 2001
Jason Guerriero: 2005

Goaltending Champions
Brad Thiessen: 2009
Cayden Primeau: 2018, 2019
Devon Levi: 2022

Best Defensive Defenseman
Tim Judy: 2005
Louis Liotti: 2009
Josh Manson: 2014
Jordan Harris: 2022
Hunter McDonald: 2023

Three-Stars Award
Keni Gibson: 2004
Brad Thiessen: 2009
Clay Witt: 2014
Adam Gaudette: 2018
Cayden Primeau: 2019
Aidan McDonough: 2021
Devon Levi: 2022

Coach of the Year
Fernie Flaman: 1989
Bruce Crowder: 1998
Greg Cronin: 2009
Jerry Keefe: 2022

Tournament Most Valuable Player
Bruce Racine: 1988
Cayden Primeau: 2019

All-Conference teams
First Team

1984–85: Jim Averill, D; Rod Isbister, F
1985–86: Claude Lodin, D; Jay Heinbuck, F
1986–87: Bruce Racine, G
1987–88: Brian Dowd, D; David O'Brien, F
1988–89: Dave Buda, F
1989–90: Rob Cowie, D
1993–94: François Bouchard, D; Mike Taylor, F
1994–95: Dan McGillis, D; Jordan Shields, F
1995–96: Dan McGillis, D
1997–98: Marc Robitaille, G
2001–02: Jim Fahey, D
2004–05: Keni Gibson, G; Jason Guerriero, F
2008–09: Brad Thiessen, G
2014–15: Kevin Roy, F
2016–17: Zach Aston-Reese, F
2017–18: Cayden Primeau, G; Jérémy Davies, D; Adam Gaudette, F; Dylan Sikura, F
2018–19: Cayden Primeau, G; Jérémy Davies, D
2019–20: Tyler Madden, F
2021–22: Devon Levi, G; Jordan Harris, D; Aidan McDonough, F
2022–23: Devon Levi, G; Aidan McDonough, F

Second Team

1984–85: Bruce Racine, G
1985–86: Paul Fitzsimmons, D
1987–88: Claude Lodin, D
1988–89: Rob Cowie, D; Harry Mews, F
1989–90: Harry Mews, F
1990–91: Rob Cowie, D
2000–01: Jim Fahey, D
2004–05: Mike Morris, F
2007–08: Joe Vitale, F
2008–09: Ryan Ginand, F
2010–11: Wade MacLeod, F
2013–14: Clay Witt, G; Josh Manson, D; Kevin Roy, F
2015–16: Zach Aston-Reese, F
2016–17: Dylan Sikura, F
2017–18: Nolan Stevens, F
2019–20: Ryan Shea, D
2020–21: Zach Solow, F; Jordan Harris, D
2022–23: Justin Hyrckowian, F

Third Team All-Hockey East

2016–17: Adam Gaudette, F

Rookie Team

1984–85: Bruce Racine, G
1987–88: Will Averill, D
1990–91: Mike Taylor, F
1991–92: Todd Reynolds, G
1992–93: Mike Veisor, G; Dan McGillis, D
1997–98: Brian Cummings, F
1998–99: Jim Fahey, D; Willie Levesque, F
2001–02: Keni Gibson, G
2002–03: Mike Morris, F
2006–07: Brad Thiessen, G; Chad Costello, F
2008–09: Steve Quailer, F
2009–10: Chris Rawlings, G; Jake Newton, D
2010–11: Anthony Bitetto, D; Brodie Reid, F
2011–12: Ludwig Karlsson, F
2012–13: Kevin Roy, F
2013–14: Mike Szmatula, F
2017–18: Cayden Primeau, G
2018–19: Tyler Madden, F
2020–21: Gunnarwolfe Fontaine, F
2021–22: Devon Levi, G; Justin Hyrckowian, F; Jack Hughes, F
2022–23: Cam Lund, F; Hunter McDonald, D

Northeastern Huskies Hall of Fame
The following is a list of people associated with the Northeastern men's ice hockey program who were elected into the Northeastern Huskies Hall of Fame (induction date in parenthesis).

David Archambault (2016)
Jim Averill (2002)
Eddie Barry (1976)
Robert F. Barry (1985)
Jim Bell (1974)
John Bialek (1980)
Larry Bone (1993)
Randy Bucyk (2011)
John R. Byrne (1979)
William Lee Carter (1979)
Richard Cavanaugh (1978)
Art Chisholm (1977)
Dave Coleman (1981)
John Connelly (1975)
Rob Cowie (2005)
Leo Dupere (1984)
Jim Fahey (2012)
Paul Filipe (2004)
Fernie Flaman (1989)
Jay Heinbuck (2010)
Mike Holmes (1991)
Charles Huck (2000)
Rod Isbister (2003)
Ken Manchurek (2006)
Jim Martel (1990)
Ed McCarty (1988)
Paul McDougall (1996)
Dan McGillis (2009)
Don McKenney (1999)
Neil McPhee (1980)
Harry Mews (2009)
David O'Brien (1995)
Ray Picard (1977)
David Poile (1987)
Eric Porter (1982)
Bruce Racine (2001)
Bill Seabury (1986)
Jordan Shields (2013)
Don Turcotte (1983)
Wayne Turner (1994)
Jim Walsh (1991)
Sid Watson (1975)
Dean Webb (1981)
Andrew Zamparelli (1983)

Olympians
This is a list of Northeastern alumni were a part of an Olympic team.

Huskies in the NHL
As of March 6, 2023.

Source:

See also
Northeastern Huskies women's ice hockey

Notes

References

External links
 

 
Ice hockey teams in Boston
1929 establishments in Massachusetts